Solution-focused (brief) therapy (SFBT) is a goal-directed collaborative approach to psychotherapeutic change that is conducted through direct observation of clients' responses to a series of precisely constructed questions. Based upon social constructivist thinking and Wittgensteinian philosophy, SFBT focuses on addressing what clients want to achieve without exploring the history and provenance of problem(s). SF therapy sessions typically focus on the present and future, focusing on the past only to the degree necessary for communicating empathy and accurate understanding of the client's concerns.

SFBT is future-oriented and goal-oriented interviewing technique that helps clients "build solutions." Elliot Connie defines solution building as "a collaborative language process between the client(s) and the therapist that develops a detailed description of the client(s)' preferred future/goals and identifies exceptions and past successes". By doing so, SFBT focuses on clients' strengths and resilience.

General introduction
The solution-focused brief therapy approach grew from the work of American social workers Steve de Shazer, Insoo Kim Berg, and their team at the Milwaukee Brief Family Therapy Center (BFTC) in Milwaukee, Wisconsin. A private training and therapy institute, BFTC was started by dissatisfied former staff members from a Milwaukee agency who were interested in exploring brief therapy approaches then being developed at the Mental Research Institute (MRI) in Palo Alto, California. The initial group included married partners, Steve de Shazer, Insoo Berg, Jim Derks, Elam Nunnally, Judith Tietyen, Don Norman, Marilyn La Court and Eve Lipchik. Their students included John Walter, Jane Peller, Michele Weiner-Davis and Yvonne Dolan. Steve de Shazer and Berg, primary developers of the approach, co-authored an update of SFBT in 2007, shortly before their deaths. SFBT evolved from the Brief Therapy that was practiced at MRI.

The solution-focused approach was developed inductively rather than deductively; Berg, de Shazer and their team spent thousands of hours carefully observing live and recorded therapy sessions. Any behaviors or words on the part of the therapist that reliably led to positive therapeutic change on the part of the clients were painstakingly noted and incorporated into the SFBT approach. In most traditional psychotherapeutic approaches starting with Freud, practitioners assumed that it was necessary to make an extensive analysis of the history and cause of their clients' problems before attempting to develop any sort of solution. Solution-focused therapists see the therapeutic change process radically differently. Informed by the observations of Steve de Shazer, recognizing that although "causes of problems may be extremely complex, their solutions do not necessarily need to be".

SFBT might be best defined by what it does not do because SFBT presents an innovative and radically different approach from traditional psychotherapy. Traditional psychotherapy looks at how problems happen, manifest, and resolve. The problem-solving approach is influenced by the medical model, where the symptoms are assessed to diagnose and treat the malady. Outside of SFBT, the almost universal belief is that the clinician must define and understand the problem to help. To do this, the practitioner must develop some information about the nature of problems that they will help resolve and ask questions about the client's symptoms. The more common problem-solving approach includes a description of the problem, an assessment of the problem, and plan and execute interventions to resolve or mitigate the impact of the problem. This is followed by an evaluation determining the success of the intervention and follow-up if necessary.

SFBT posits that a therapist can help clients resolve their problems without identifying the details or source problem and completely avoids exploring the details and context of the problem. SFBT believes that an assessment of the problem is entirely unnecessary. Focusing on the problem actually may serve to shift the client away from the solution. This is because SFBT fundamentally believes that the nature of the solution can be completely different from the problem. So instead, SFBT focuses on building solutions by conceptualizing a preferred future with clients. SFBT is all about finding alternatives to the problem, not identifying and eliminating the problem.

SFBT is strengths-based and supports clients' self-determination. Using the client's language, SFBT uses the client's perspective and fosters cooperation. The focus on the strengths and resources of clients is a factor in why some social workers choose SFBT.

SFBT is designed to help people change their lives in the fastest way possible. By finding and amplifying exceptions, change is efficient and effective. Treatment usually lasts less than six sessions, and it can work in about two sessions. Its brevity and its flexibility have made SFBT the choice of intervention for many health care settings. Interventions in a medical setting many times need to be brief. Agencies also choose SFBT because its efficiency translates into monetary savings.

History 
 
Solution-focused brief therapy is one of a family of approaches, known as systems therapies, that have been developed over the past 50 years or so, first in the US, and eventually evolving around the world, including Europe. The title SFBT, and the specific steps involved in its practice, are attributed to husband and wife Steve de Shazer and Insoo Kim Berg, two American social workers, and their team at The Brief Family Therapy Center (BFTC) in Milwaukee, USA. Core members of this team were Jim Derks, Elam Nunnally, Marilyn LaCourt, and Eve Lipchik as well as students Pat Bielke, Dave Pakenham, John Walter, Jane Peller,  Elam Nunnally, Alex Molnar, and Michele Weiner-Davis. Wallace Gingerich and Gale Miller joined a few years later as research assistants.

In the 1970s, Steve de Shazer, his wife Insoo Kim Berg, and colleagues conducted Brief Family Therapy at Family Service of Milwaukee, a community agency, and installed one-way mirrors to observe sessions with clients to study which activities were most beneficial for the clients. The group of therapists used to meet in the home of Steve de Shazer and Insoo Kim Berg where a therapist saw clients pro bono in the living room while the others observed. Then they would discuss their thoughts together in a bedroom. In 1978, when the administration disallowed the one-way mirrors, Steve de Shazer, Insoo Kim Berg put together a team of practitioners and students and founded the Brief Family Therapy Center in Milwaukee, Wisconsin, to continue their work. The result was the eventual development of SFBT.
BFTC served as a research center to study, develop, and test techniques of psychotherapy to find those that are most efficient and effective with clients. The team at BFTC was very diverse, with practitioners with various backgrounds, educations, and academic disciplines. Besides mental health professionals, the team included educators, sociologists, linguists, and even engineers and philosophers. Steve de Shazer, the director of BFTC, referred to this group as a "therapeutic think tank" . Over time people began to request training, so BFTC became a research and training center.

SFBT has its roots in Brief Family Therapy, a type of family therapy practiced at the Mental Research Institute (MRI). In the 1970s, Steve de Shazer, the primary creator of SFBT, studied the work done at MRI and founded BFTC to serve as "the MRI of the Midwest". John Weakland at MRI influenced Steve to develop simple techniques in brief goal-focused therapy, and at MRI, Steve de Shazer was introduced to the work of Milton Erickson Milton Erickson which ultimately had a significant influence on the development of SFBT.

In 1982 there was the watershed moment where the founders of SFBT, Insoo Kim Berg, Steve de Shazer, and their team transformed their Brief Therapy practice to become Solution-Focused. A family came to be treated at the Milwaukee Brief Family Therapy. During the assessment, the family provided a list of 27 problems. The team was at a loss as to what to suggest the family try to do differently. They suggested that the family come back with a list of things they want to continue to happen. The remarkable effectiveness of this spontaneous intervention led to the understanding that the solution is not necessarily related to the problem. This was the beginning of Solution-Focused Brief Therapy.

SFBT practice began to be popularized starting in the late 1980s and experienced tremendous growth in its first 15–20 years. Their work in the early 1980s built on that of a number of other innovators, among them Milton Erickson, and the group at the Mental Research Institute at Palo Alto – Gregory Bateson, Donald deAvila Jackson, Paul Watzlawick, John Weakland, Virginia Satir, Jay Haley, Richard Fisch, Janet Beavin Bavelas and others. SFBT gained tremendous popularity in the UK in the late 1990s and the 2000s. At that time, it also spread worldwide to be a leading brief therapy, with many agencies adopting SFBT as their only modality. It is now one of the most popular psychotherapeutic modalities globally.

SFBT Practice 

SFBT practitioners use conversational skills to evoke a discussion about solutions, also known as "solution talk", which is very different from "problem talk". In SFBT, the questions themselves are the intervention. The questions focus the client to a conversation that creates and fosters a change-inducing mindset and decreasing negative feelings. SFBT questions help clients think about their situation in a solution-focused way. They attach new meaning to their experiences, noticing change potential where they might not have noticed it before.

Questions and compliments are the primary tools of the solution-focused approach. SF therapists and counselors deliberately refrain from making interpretations and rarely confront their clients. Instead, they focus on identifying the client's goals, generating a detailed description of what life will be like when the goal is accomplished and the problem is either gone or coped with satisfactorily. In order to develop effective solutions, they search diligently through the client's life experiences for "exceptions", e.g. times when some aspect of the client's goal was already happening to some degree, utilizing these to co-construct uniquely appropriate and effective solutions.

SF therapists typically begin the therapeutic process by joining with client competencies. As early in the interview as respectfully possible to do so, SF therapist/counselors invite the client to envision their preferred future by describing what their life will be like when the problem is either gone or being coped with so satisfactorily that it no longer constitutes a problem.  The therapist and client then pay particular attention to any behaviors on the client's part that contribute to moving in the direction of the client's goal, whether these are small increments or larger changes. To support this approach, detailed questions are asked about how the client managed to achieve or maintain the current level of progress, any recent positive changes and how the client developed new and existing strengths, resources, and positive traits; and especially, about any exceptions to client-perceived problems.

Solution-focused therapists believe personal change is already constant. By helping people identify positive directions for change in their life and to attend to changes currently in process they wish to continue, SFBT therapists help clients construct a concrete vision of a preferred future for themselves.

SFBT therapists support clients to identify times in their life when things matched more closely with the future they prefer. Differences and similarities between the two occasions are examined. By bringing small successes to awareness, and supporting clients to repeat their successful choices and behaviors, when the problem is not there or less severe, therapist facilitate client movement towards goals and preferred futures they have identified.

One way of understanding the practice of SFBT is displayed through the acronym MECSTAT, which stands for Miracle questions, Exception questions, Coping questions, Scaling questions, Time-out, Accolades and Task.

SFBT questions ask a client to talk about their preferred future. They are asked to describe what would be different when the problem is solved or managed. For example, "What would you notice that lets you know that the problem that brought you to see me is solved?" SFBT posits that change happens when people focus and flesh out details of their preferred future. One SFBT practitioners' tool to help the client describe their preferred future is the "miracle question." This question asks the client to imagine that the problem was miraculously solved without their knowledge. It then asks, "What would be some of the first clues they let you know your problem is solved?".

The therapist also asks questions that focus on looking at previous solutions or "exceptions" to the problem. In SFBT, "Exceptions" in SFBT are the times that the problem is smaller or is coped with better and SFBT believes that every problem has exceptions. Finding exceptions helps build solutions by helping find what is working in the clients' lives. By finding and amplifying minor exceptions to the problem, they explore what is already working and orient the client to do more of what already is working.

When looking for exceptions, the practitioner does not try to convince the client that the exceptions are significant. That would go against the SFBT stance that sees the clients as the expert of their life. Instead, the therapist maintains a genuine, curious stance and asks the client to tell them how they interpret the significance of the exception. The therapist needs to maintain a not-knowing stance which can be challenging for emerging SFBT practitioners.

One tool that SFBT practitioners use to help find exceptions is to start sessions (other than the first) with the question "What's been better since we last talked?". This question reframes the client's perspective to look for exceptions, i.e., the areas that are better. Another tool practitioners use is "scaling questions." A scale is used to measure where the client rates themselves in achieving their goal. They are then asked what they notice is working that makes them rate themselves as they do and not lower. They also are asked for details about the times when the problem is less. Then, "how are you doing it?" or "how did you do it?". Exceptions can also take the form of coping, so a SFBT practitioner can ask "coping questions" to find exceptions. For example, "It sounds like a lot is going on… how are you managing?". When a client identifies behaviors that work for them, they are encouraged to continue those behaviors.

With SFBT, the session is very structured. There is a particular way to conduct a session, and there are formulated interviewing techniques used. However, practitioners report that fidelity to the philosophy is more important than fidelity to the techniques. A SFBT practitioner has to carry several assumptions to carry into the session to truly and effectively engage in authentic SFBT practice.

One core SFBT assumption is that clients are the experts in their lives and know what is best for them and how to achieve their goals. This is the essential assumption that defines SFBT. The therapist is only the expert on the questions that will evoke the change process. SFBT assumes that the clients have all they need to build a solution; they do not need the therapist to teach them skills or tell them what to do. With authentic SFBT practice resistance is rare or non-existent. The stance of curiosity and not knowing is essential for SFBT.

SFBT is radically simple and looks easy to do, but in truth SFBT is very hard to learn. SFBT requires a very disciplined practice. Because of this, many practitioners end up using components of SFBT and not practicing pure SFBT. This is often done because it can be challenging for a practitioner to change from a problem-focused stance. On the side of the coin, many new SFBT trainees struggle with being overly optimistic and with not truly validating clients' pain. This might be because the focus necessary to apply their newly learned SFBT skills and techniques take the focus away from being 'with' the client. Authentic SFBT practice requires the therapist to be very attuned to the clients' verbal and non-verbal communication and adapt the questions to meet and better understand the client's perspective.

Evidence-based status 
In the early days of the model, critics often said that SFBT does not have enough research. In 2000 a review of SFBT research just showed preliminary evidence of the efficacy of SFBT. However, in 2010 the SFBT research grew to a level where the evidence was promising, and today several meta-analyses show SFBT to be effective with internalizing issues. SFBT has a robust, broad, and growing evidence base and is recommended for use when deemed a good fit for the client and their problem.

SFBT has been examined in two meta-analyses and is supported as evidenced-based by numerous federal and state agencies and institutions, such as SAMHSA's National Registry of Evidence-Based Programs & Practices (NREPP). The conclusion of the two meta-analyses and the systematic reviews, and the overall conclusion of the most recent scholarly work on SFBT, is that solution-focused brief therapy is an effective approach to the treatment of psychological problems, with effect sizes similar to other evidenced-based approaches, such as CBT and IPT, but that these effects are found in fewer average sessions, and using an approach style that is more benign.

Applications of SFBT 
SFBT is very adaptable to many settings because it helps the clients create custom-made interventions for themselves, and the client is always considered to be the expert. Even the practitioner's language is taken from the words the client uses to describe their life and preferred future. The result is that SFBT provides interventions that are perfectly matched with the clients' way of understanding and acting. Techniques such as the miracle question can be adapted to make them more culturally relevant and come across in ways more empathetic and supportive based on the culture and needs of the population being served.

SFBT works well with children and families and can be applied to many family-related situations. It is effective with adolescents, pregnant and postpartum women, couples, and parents. SFBT was shown to be effective for families in the child welfare system, with case management in social welfare programs, financial counseling, and with therapy groups.

SFBT has been applied to many settings, including education and business settings including coaching. and counselling. It is effective in schools and with college students. It was successfully used with populations in jails, inpatient addiction rehab centers, inpatient psychiatric facilities, and in a wide range of medical settings. It has been helpful with treating family members of patients with serious illnesses.

SFBT is effective with people in many countries and cultures, including people from Turkey, Chile, Iran, and China. A systematic review showed it to be effective with Latinos.

SFBT works in treating people who experienced trauma. It has been suggested to use with patients that are suicidal or in crisis, families coping with suicide, and patients with eating disorders substance use disorders, and obesity.  It was also suggested as a promising intervention for individuals with a brain injury and was helpful with those with intellectual disabilities. It has even been documented to have been successfully used with a patient in a psychotic crisis.

SFBT is effective in treating clients with depression. It has been shown to help increase self-esteem, hope, and good behavior among adolescents and children.  It has been suggested that SFBT's ability to engender hope is what makes it effective for patients suffering from depression as the presence of hope is shown to have an inverse relationship with depression.

Workers with child protective services report in a qualitative study that SFBT training and supervision was helpful for them to work in a more cooperative and strength-based way and improved the overall mood and atmosphere of their encounters. There are models designed for child protection services that incorporate aspects of SFBT because SFBT alone cannot be used for child protective services because a more authoritative approach is necessary.

See also
 Family therapy
 Future-oriented therapy
 Narrative therapy
 Response-based therapy

References

Further reading
Berg, Insoo Kim and S.deShazer: Making numbers talk: Language in therapy. In S. Friedman (Ed.), "The new language of change: Constructive collaboration in psychotherapy." New York:Guilford, 1993.
Berg, Insoo Kim, "Family based services: A solution-focused approach." New York:Norton. 1994.
Berg, Insoo Kim; "Solution-Focused Therapy: An Interview with Insoo Kim Berg." Psychotherapy.net, 2003.
Cade, B., and W.H. O’Hanlon: A Brief Guide to Brief Therapy. W.W. Norton & Co 1993.
De Jong, Peter and Insoo Kim Berg Interviewing for Solutions Brooks Cole Publishers, 2nd edition 2002
Denborough, D.; Family Therapy: Exploring the Field's Past, Present and Possible Futures. Adelaide, South Australia: Dulwich Centre Publications, 2001.
de Shazer, Steve: Clues; Investigating Solutions in Brief Therapy. W.W. Norton & Co 1988
George,E., C.Iveson, H. Ratner; Problem to solution; brief therapy with individuals and families. BT Press, 1990.
Greenberg, Gail R., Keren Ganshorn and Alanna Danilkewic. 2001. Solution-focused therapy; A counseling model for busy family physicians. "Canadian Family Physician," 47 (November): 2289–2295.
Guterman, J.T. (2006). Mastering the Art of Solution-Focused Counseling. Alexandria, VA: American Counseling Association. 

Hubble, M.A., B.L. Duncan, S.D. Miller; The Heart and Soul of Change; what works in therapy. American Psychological Association, 1999.
 Lutz, A. B. (2014). Learning solution-focused therapy: An illustrated guide. Arlington, VA: American Psychiatric Press. (Includes over 30 companion videos demonstrating the approach)
Miller, S.D., M.A. Hubble, B.L. Duncan; Handbook of Solution-focused brief therapy. Jossey-Bass Publishers, 1996.
Murphy, J.J. (1997). Solution-focused counseling in middle and high schools. American Counseling Association: Alexandria, VA.
O’Connell, B.; Solution Focused Therapy. Sage, 1998.
O’Hanlon, Bill, and S. Beadle; A Field Guide to PossibilityLand: possibility therapy methods. BT Press 1996.
O'Hanlon, Bill and M. Weiner-Davis: "In Search of Solutions: A New Direction in Psychotherapy." WW Norton & CO. New York 1989
Simon, Joel K. & Nelson, Thorana S. (2007). Solution-focused brief practice with long-term clients in mental health services: "I'm more than my label". New York: Taylor & Francis.
Simon, Joel K. (2009). Solution focused practice in end-of-life and grief counseling. New York: Springer Publication.
Talmon, M.; Single Session Therapy; maximizing the effect of the first (and often only) therapeutic encounter. Jossey-Bass Publishers, 1990.
Trepper, Terry S., Eric E. McCollum, Peter De Jong, Harry Korman, Wallace Gingerich, and Cynthia Franklin. 2010. "Solution focused therapy treatment manual for working with individuals." [Hammond, IN?]: Research Committee of the Solution Focused Brief Therapy Association.
Ziegler, P. and T. Hiller: Recreating Partnership: A Solution-Oriented, Collaborative Approach to Couples Therapy. W.W. Norton 2001.

External links
 Solution Focused Brief Therapy Association
 Social Construction Therapies Network
 The Association for Solution Focused Hypnotherapy
 Institute for Solution Focused Therapy

Psychotherapies